David Wilms (born October 10, 1963 in Fröndenberg/Ruhr, Germany) is a German television host.
He hosts shows on Super RTL like Super Toy Club and Q-Boot DAS QUIZ.
At the age of five Wilms was already onstage and sang Schlager or talking sketches.

Between 1991 and 1993 he hosted the gay-themed show Andersrum on Berlin's TV channel FAB .

Between 1997 and 1999 he played Theo Klages in German soap opera Lindenstraße, who wed Carsten Flöter before same sex marriage was made legal.
He's a trained educator, but works also in other fields.
Wilms is a vegetarian and an animal-rights activist.
He lives in Cologne where he is director of the entertainment-company bigSmile.

Career

Actor
Lindenstraße (ARD)
Gute Zeiten, schlechte Zeiten (RTL)
Unter uns (RTL)
Streit um drei (ZDF)
Jede Menge Leben (ZDF)
Lukas (ZDF)
Just a Matter of Duty (1993)

Hosting
 Toggo Weihnachtsmarkt
 Q-Boot – Das Quiz (Super RTL, 2001–2002)
 Super Toy Club (Super RTL, 1999–2005)
 Deutschland sucht den Superstar – Das Magazin (Super RTL)
 Toggo Total (Super RTL)
 Toggo Spaß Tag (Super RTL)
 Kreativ-Jugendwettbewerb der Banken in NRW
 Bravo Super Show (RTL; Warm Up)
 US 5 Fankonzert (RTL 2, BRAVO TV)
 Toy Innovation Award (Spielwarenmesse Nürnberg)
 Schokoticket 2007 (Casting und Jury; Verkehrsverband Rhein-Ruhr)
 Toggo Tour (Super RTL)
 Schau nicht weg Live Open Air 2007 (VIVA, Pre-Show)
 Toggo Tour 2008 (Super RTL)
 Die Toggo 5 (Super RTL; Top 10 Song: My Wish For Christmas)
 BRAVO meets YOU-Jugendmesse
 Der goldene Spatz (MDR)

Producer
 „Haselhörnchen, Jammerlappen and Co.“ (Toggo TV, Super RTL)
 „Peb und Pebber – Helden privat“, (Toggo TV, Super RTL)
 „Clara Siel“ on Hella von Sinnen Show (Sat.1)
 „Die anspruchsvollen Rollen“ („Zimmer frei“, WDR)
 „Wiwaldi“ („Zimmer frei“, WDR)
 „Tuck“ (Fantsypride, Phantasialand in Brühl)
 Die Haselhörnchen-Show

External links
 Official page of BigSmile
 David Wilms on Super RTL.de

1963 births
Living people
People from Fröndenberg
German television personalities